Route 13 is a  north–south state highway in the north-central region of the U.S. state of Massachusetts. Its southern terminus is at Route 12 in Leominster and its northern terminus is a continuation as New Hampshire Route 13 near Brookline, New Hampshire.

Route description

Route 13 begins at Route 12 north of downtown Leominster, where that route turns from Main Street to North Main Street.  Route 13 continues along Main Street, crossing Route 2 near the Mall at Whitney Field, before crossing the north branch of the Nashua River and the Fitchburg Line of the MBTA Commuter Rail before turning northward towards the village of Whalom and the town of Lunenburg.  In Lunenburg, the road turns eastward, running concurrently with Route 2A for approximately  before turning northward again. It then passes into Townsend, where it crosses the Squannacook River and through the downtown area,  before continuing through the Townsend State Forest and ending at the New Hampshire state line, where the road becomes New Hampshire Route 13, running northward towards Milford. 

Whalom Park, a former amusement park which stood from 1893 to 2000, was located along Route 13 in Lunenburg, just north of the Leominster town line.

Major intersections

References

013